Cunco is a Chilean commune and city in Cautín Province, Araucanía Region. The town is located 60 km southeast of the city of Temuco and 77 km west of Icalma International Pass.

The major geographical features of this commune are the Allipén River and the Colico Lake.

History 
Cunco was founded by Colonel Gregorio Urrutia in 1883 as a frontier fort, between the marshes Cunco and Nahuelcura, and close to a tributary to the Allipén river. The arrival of the railroad at the beginning of the twentieth century accelerater its urban development. It changed legal status to "commune" on 20 August 1918.
 
In 1918 Cunco was the ending point of the first flight by an airplane across the Andes, when Luis Candelaria flew from Zapala, Argentina, on April 13.

Demographics
Of these, 8,806 (47.1%) lived in urban areas and 9,897 (52.9%) in rural areas. The population grew by 2% (364 persons) between the 1992 and 2002 censuses.

Administration
As a commune, Cunco is a third-level administrative division of Chile administered by a communal council, headed by an alcalde who is directly elected every four years. The 2008-2012 alcalde is Patricio Mittersteiner Garrido. The communal council has the following members:
 Osvaldo Inostroza Mora
 Danilo Urrutia Cárcamo
 Rene Sepulveda Ceballos
 Patricio Oakley Oviedo
 Cristian Moraga Lagos
 Alfonso Coke Candia

Within the electoral divisions of Chile, Zapallar belongs to the 52nd electoral district and 15th senatorial constituency.

References

External links
 Gobierno Regional de la Araucanía: Cunco
 Munipalidad de Cunco
 Porta Cunco (Independent Website)

19th-century fortifications in Chile
Communes of Chile
Populated places in Cautín Province
1883 establishments in Chile